Serhiy Anatolіyovich Terokhin is Ukrainian economist and politician. MP of Ukraine. Minister of Economy of Ukraine from 4 February to 27 September 2005. Batkivshchyna Party member.

References

External links 
 Biography

1963 births
Politicians from Kyiv
Living people
Second convocation members of the Verkhovna Rada
Third convocation members of the Verkhovna Rada
Fourth convocation members of the Verkhovna Rada
Fifth convocation members of the Verkhovna Rada
Sixth convocation members of the Verkhovna Rada
Seventh convocation members of the Verkhovna Rada
Economy ministers of Ukraine
Economy and European integration ministers of Ukraine
All-Ukrainian Union "Fatherland" politicians
Reforms and Order Party politicians
Taras Shevchenko National University of Kyiv alumni
Harvard University faculty
Emory University alumni
Laureates of the Honorary Diploma of the Verkhovna Rada of Ukraine
Recipients of the Honorary Diploma of the Cabinet of Ministers of Ukraine